Warren E. Steller Field is a baseball field at Bowling Green State University in Bowling Green, Ohio, where the Bowling Green Falcons baseball team plays. The field is named after Warren E. Steller, a former BGSU instructor and former coach of the Bowling Green's football (1924–34) and baseball (1925, 1928–59) teams.  It was officially named for Warren E. Steller in 1967.  Steller Field is located just north of the Slater Family Ice Arena on the eastern side of the campus.  The dimensions of the field from home plate to the outfield fences are 340 feet to left field, 400 feet to center field, and 340 feet to right field.

History

Steller Field was built in 1964 and cost $150,000 to construct.  Steller Field has seen renovations in 1965, 1968, and 2002, which has expanded the capacity of 2,500.  In fall 2012, a new electronic scoreboard was installed at the facility, and the backstop was renovated. In October 2019, the stadium surrounding the field was named the Gary Haas Stadium, after former BGSU baseball player Gary Haas. This changed in December of 2021 when the BGSU board of trustees voted to remove the name.

Other uses
From 1987–1991, the field was home to the Great Lakes Summer Collegiate League's Bowling Green Breeze.  In 2008, another Great Lakes Collegiate Summer League team, the Lake Erie Monarchs, used the field for a single season.

See also
 List of NCAA Division I baseball venues

References

External links
BGSU Falcons Baseball official website
Lake Erie Monarchs official website

College baseball venues in the United States
Bowling Green Falcons baseball
Baseball venues in Ohio
Buildings and structures in Wood County, Ohio
1964 establishments in Ohio
Sports venues completed in 1964